The 2018 LFA Segunda is the third season of the Liga Futebol Amadora Segunda Divisão. The season began on March 6 and finished on August 6.

Atlético Ultramar is the last season champions and got promoted to 2018 LFA Primeira.

Assalam won their first LFA Segunda title, after a 5–1 win over Nagarjo in their last match on 19 July 2018.

Assalam won their first promotion to 2019 LFA Primeira, with one match to spare following a 4–0 win over Lalenok United on 28 June 2018. Lalenok United won their first promotion to LFA Primeira, with one match to spare following their competitor Sporting only playing a 1–1 draw against Lica-Lica on 17 July 2018.

Santa Cruz became the first team to be relegated from LFA Segunda after losing 2–3 in their last match against Zebra on 31 July 2018. Kablaky became the second team to be relegated after losing 1–2 in their last match against Porto on 2 August 2018, while Porto with their victory managed to save them from relegation.

Teams
There are 12 teams that will play this season.

from Segunda Divisaun
Atlético Ultramar and DIT F.C. promoted to 2018 LFA Primeira after securing place as champions and runners-up in 2017 Segunda Divisao. FC Café and Sport Dili e Benfica were relegated from 2017 Segunda Divisao after finished 5th and bottom place of Group A,  while YMCA FC and União de Timor were relegated from 2017 Segunda Divisao after finished 6th and bottom place of Group B.

to Segunda Divisaun
FC Zebra and Porto Taibesse were relegated to 2018 LFA Segunda after finished 7th and bottom place of 2017 Primeira Divisao. Fitun Estudante (FIEL), Lalenok United and FC Lero promoted to 2018 LFA Segunda after win the playoff tournament.

Locations

Personnel

Managerial changes

Stadiums  
 Primary venues used in the 2018 LFA Segunda:

Foreign players

Restricting the number of foreign players strictly to four per team. A team could use four foreign players on the field each game.

League table

Result table

Fixtures and results
All matches played every Tuesday to Sunday every week except the final league match will played on Monday 6 August 2018.

Week 1

Week 2

Week 3

Week 4

Week 5

Week 6

Week 7

Week 8

Week 9

Week 10

Week 11

Week 12

Week 13

Week 14

Week 15

Week 16

Week 17

Week 18

Week 19

Week 20

Week 21

Season statistics

Top scorers

Hat-tricks

 

Notes:
(H) – Home ; (A) – Away
5 – player scorer 5 goals

Clean sheets

Own goals

See also
 2018 LFA Primeira
 2018 Taça 12 de Novembro

Notes

References

External links
Official website
Official Facebook page

Segunda
Timor-Leste
2018 in Asian football